Vaccinium koreanum, the Korean blueberry, is a plant species native to Korea and neighboring Liaoning Province in China. It is a deciduous shrub with toothed leaves and red, ellipsoid berries. It grows on rocky, mountain summits.

References

External links 
 Line drawing, Flora of China Illustrations vol. 14, fig. 686, 6-7 

koreanum
Flora of Korea
Flora of China
Plants described in 1922
Taxa named by Takenoshin Nakai
Blueberries